Frederick Walker Pitkin (August 31, 1837 – December 18, 1886), a U.S. Republican Party politician, served as the second Governor of Colorado, United States from 1879 to 1883.

Life and career
Frederick Pitkin was born in Manchester, Connecticut. He graduated cum laude from Wesleyan University in 1858, and earned a law degree from Albany Law School in 1859. Following graduation, he moved to Milwaukee, Wisconsin to establish the law firm of Palmer, Hooker, and Pitkin. In 1872, he resigned from the firm due to illness, and set sail for Europe in search of a cure.

Returning to the United States in 1874, he settled in southwestern Colorado, where his health stabilized, and resumed his career as an attorney. In addition, he invested in the mining industry. Utilizing his contacts in the mining industry, he announced his candidacy for Governor of Colorado in 1878, and won. During his two terms as governor, he dealt with a number of crises including the railway feud involving the Atchison, Topeka-Santa Fe, and the Denver-Rio Grande rail companies. He ordered the suppression of the Ute Indian uprising at the Milk Creek Battle or Meeker Massacre in 1879. In 1880, he declared martial law during the mining strike at Leadville. He was an unsuccessful candidate for U.S. Senate in 1882.

Following his retirement from public office, he settled in Pueblo, Colorado and resumed his law practice and mining business. He died in Pueblo and was buried in Riverside Cemetery in Denver, Colorado. Later, his remains were moved to Fairmount Cemetery in Denver.

He and his wife Fidelia James, a native of Lockport, New York, had three children: Robert James Pitkin, Florence Pitkin, and George Orrin Pitkin.

Entities named after Pitkin
 Pitkin County, Colorado
 Pitkin, Colorado
 Pitkin Avenue, Saguache, Colorado
 Pitkin Street, Fort Collins, Colorado
 Pitkin Avenue, Glenwood Springs, Colorado 
 Pitkin Avenue, Grand Junction, Colorado
 Pitkin Avenue, Pueblo, Colorado

References

External links

1837 births
1886 deaths
Republican Party governors of Colorado
People from Pueblo, Colorado
People from Manchester, Connecticut
American mining businesspeople
Colorado lawyers
Wesleyan University alumni
Albany Law School alumni
Burials at Fairmount Cemetery (Denver, Colorado)
19th-century American politicians
19th-century American lawyers
19th-century American businesspeople